Nectandra astyla is a species of plant in the family Lauraceae. It is endemic to Peru.

References

astyla
Endemic flora of Peru
Vulnerable flora of South America
Taxonomy articles created by Polbot
Trees of Peru